Kulai is a town and the capital of Kulai District, Johor, Malaysia. It is administered by the Kulai Municipal Council (MPKu), which was earlier known as the Kulai District Council.

Geography

It is located in the center of the district. Kulai town and other towns within this district are located along the old trunk road linking Kuala Lumpur and Johor Bahru. The main road, Federal Route 1, is lined with many retail shops. There are also many housing estates within the township. The town is surrounded by rubber and oil palm estates.

Climate
Kulai has a tropical rainforest climate (Af) with heavy rainfall year-round.

Economy
The locals are mostly involved in the agriculture sector, particularly in the oil palm and rubber estates surrounding the town. Many of the people work in small retail shops, which are located along the trunk road. Kulai has the first settlement of FELDA's (Federal Land Development Agency) oil palm plantation in the country - FELDA Taib Andak, which was launched by the second Prime Minister of Malaysia, Tun Abdul Razak. Kulai is still one of the main producers of palm oil in the country due to its numerous oil palm plantations. Kulai also exports fresh vegetables to Singapore on a daily basis.

The economy of Kulai has improved with numerous factories being set up in both Kulai and Senai. There are some public listed companies which have their offices and factories in Kulai, such as Yi-Lai Industry Berhad located in Batu 23 (Jalan Kulai-Air Hitam) ; SCGM Berhad which located in Batu 24 1/2 (Jalan Kulai-Air Hitam) and JCY International Berhad which located in Kelapa Sawit

Kulai is also within the Iskandar Development Region (IDR).

Shopping Centres 
 Kulai Centrepoint (Super Cowboy)
 IOI Mall Kulai
 Mydin Mall Kulai Utama
 Aeon Mall Kulaijaya
 Lotus's
 Econsave Putri Kulai
 TJ Mart Saleng
 The Commune（Opening to 2023Q4）

Education

Foon Yew High School campus of Kulai located in this district to provide Chinese high school education for the local community.

Culture
The Chinese community in Kulai mainly communicate in Hakka Chinese dialects. There are quite a number of Chinese temples to fulfill the religious needs of the local Chinese community, like Wan Xian Miao Temple (古来萬仙廟) (founded in 1913), Hong Sen Tai Tee Old Temple (古来新港洪仙大帝古廟) (founded in 1891), Yuen Sun Kung Temple (古来云山宫) (founded in 1933) and several other temples. Prominent Temples like Hua Guo Shan Temple (士年纳路口花果山) and Kulai Putuo Village (古来普陀村) are also tourist attraction spots.

There are also several churches in Kulai include the Presbyterian Church(SYNOD), Christ the King Catholic Church, Baptist Church, Methodist Church and churches of other denominations. The Masjid Jamek is located within Kulai town and serve the needs of the Muslim community.

Transportation

Kulai was an important stopover on the Johor Bahru–Kuala Lumpur trunk road in the 1970s and 1980s until the North–South Expressway opened in 1994, which bypassed the town. The trunk road is now identified as Road One. Senai Airport, the international airport which serves Johor is within the municipality.
 railway station located nearby the trunk road and served by KTM Intercity Gemas-JB Sentral shuttle train.

Notable residents
 Mawi - the winner of the 2005 Akademi Fantasia singing competition and now becomes among the most popular Malaysian singer, from FELDA Taib Andak.
 Penny Tai - popular female singer and the winner of Best Composer (爱疯了) at Taiwanese Golden Melody Awards 2006 (金曲奖).

References

Kulai District
Towns in Johor